Edemir Rodríguez Mercado (born October 21, 1984  in Santa Cruz de la Sierra) is a Bolivian football defender who plays for Club Always Ready.

Career
In June 2012, Rodriguez joined FC Baku in the Azerbaijan Premier League.

Rodríguez has been capped for the Bolivia national team 4 times.

Career statistics

Club

International

Statistics accurate as of match played 10 November 2016

Honours
Club Bolívar
Liga de Fútbol Profesional Boliviano: 2011

References

External links
 
 

1984 births
Afro-Bolivian people
Living people
Sportspeople from Santa Cruz de la Sierra
Bolivian footballers
Bolivian expatriate footballers
FC Baku players
Club San José players
Club Bolívar players
Club Real Potosí players
Club Always Ready players
Bolivian Primera División players
Azerbaijan Premier League players
Bolivia international footballers
Association football defenders
2007 Copa América players
2015 Copa América players
Expatriate footballers in Azerbaijan
Bolivian people of African descent